Ape Yalu Punchi Boothaya is a 2010 Sri Lankan Sinhala children's film directed by Srilal Priyadeva and produced by N. Udaya Kumar for Balaji Films. The film revolves around a ghost kid who helped children to recover their bad lives to good ones. It stars comic duo Bandu Samarasinghe, Tennyson Cooray, Ananda Wickramage, D. B. Gangodathanna and Eardley Wedamuni. Music for the film is done by renowned musician Edward Jayakody. It is the 1143rd Sri Lankan film in the Sinhala cinema.

The film used digital technology extensively which is handled by Dreams and Magic Company. They introduced of the digital technology as well as High Definition Technology to the Sri Lankan cinematic industry.

Cast
 Bandu Samarasinghe as Isurusiri, the astrologist 
 Tennyson Cooray as Jeevan Gurunnanse
 Ananda Wickramage as Cyril
 D.B. Gangodathenna as Gurunnanse
 Eardley Wedamuni
 Asela Jayakody as Premaratne
 Vinusha Gaveen as Tharaka
 Dhanuskha Iroshani as Tharindu's step mother
 Sithija Abishek as Pancha, the Punchi Boothaya
 Kaveesha Nethmi as Bhagya
 Sinidu Tharaka as Tharindu
 Yasindu Adithya
 Teddy Vidyalankara as Uncle Tarzan, the Three-wheel driver
 Rajiv Nanayakkara as Wijeratne sir

Soundtrack

References

2010 films
2010s Sinhala-language films